The boys' artistic individual all-around competition at the 2018 Summer Youth Olympics was held at the America Pavilion on 11 October.

Qualification

Eighteen gymnasts qualified into the final.

Final

References

External links
Qualification results 
Final results 

Boys' artistic individual all-around